The Roman Catholic Diocese of Lipari was a Latin diocese of the Roman Catholic Church located in the town of Lipari in the Aeolian Islands of Sicily, Italy. The diocese consists of the entire island of Lipari as well as seven smaller adjacent islands. It is now incorporated into the Archdiocese of Messina-Lipari-Santa Lucia del Mela.

History 
The diocese of Lipari had already been erected by the 5th Century. The names of several early bishops are attested:

Augustus (501, 502)
Venantius (553)
Agatho (593)
[Paulinus] (under Pope Gregory I)

Lipari is a volcanic island. Its last major eruption took place in 729, leaving a high pumice cone which is 476m (1570 feet) high; the population must have fled, at least temporarily. One crater, called Monte Pilato, is mined for pumice and has numerous caves. There are still hot springs and fumaroles.

In 1544 the pirate Barbarossa completely depopulated the island.  It was at the direction of the Emperor Charles V, who noted the island's strategic position, that it was repopulated.

In 1743, the city of Lipari had about 13,000 inhabitants, under the temporal authority of the King of Naples. The diocese was directly subject to the authority of the Pope, that is, Lipari had no regional Metropolitan.  The Cathedral had a Chapter which contained four dignities (Archdeacon, Deacon, Cantor, Treasurer) and fifteen Canons.

On September 30, 1986, as part of a Vatican effort to reduce the number of redundant Italian dioceses, the diocese of Lipari was suppressed as an independent entity and incorporated into the Archdiocese of Messina-Lipari-Santa Lucia del Mela.

Bishops

to 1500

[Agatho (c. 254)]
Augustus (501, 502)
Venantius (553)
Agatho (593)
Peregrinus (c. 660)
Basilius (c. 787)
Samuel (c. 879)
Sede Vacante
...
Gilibertus (1157 – 1166)
Stephanus (1180 – 1199)
Anselmus (c. 1208 – 1227?)
Jacobus ( – 25 September 1225)
Paganus (10 October 1229 – 3 March 1246)
Philippus (attested in 1250)
Bartholomaeus de Lentino, O.P. (5 January 1254 – 1282)
Pandulfus (25 February 1286 – 4 July 1290)
Joannes, O.P. (1304 – 1342)
Vincentius, O.Min. (27 November 1342 – 1346)
Petrus de Teutonico, O.Min. (15 February 1346 – 21 January 1354)
Petrus de Thomas, O.Carm. (1354 – 10 May 1359)
Joannes Graphei, O.Min. (17 July 1360 – 1373)
Ubertinus de Coriliono, O.Min. (28 November 1373 – 1386)
Franciscus, O.P. (30 May 1386 – 18 March 1388)
Ubertinus de Coriliono, O.Min. (restored, 16 May 1390 – 18 August 1397)
Franciscus Gaptulus (18 December 1397 – 18 April 1399)
Antonius (11 June 1400 – 1402?)
Thomas (ca. 1402 –  1419?)
Antonius de Comite (31 July 1419 – 31 July 1432)

...
Francesco da Stilo, O.P. (1461–1489 Died)
Giacomo Carduini (1489–1506 Died)

from 1500 to 1800

Luigi de Amato (1506–1515 Appointed, Bishop of San Marco)
Antonio Zeno (bishop) (1515–1530 Died)
Gregorio Magalotti (1532–1534 Appointed, Bishop of Chiusi)
Baldo Ferratini (1534–1558 Appointed, Bishop of Amelia)
Filippo Lancia (1554–1564 Died)
Antonio Giustiniani, O.P. (1564–1571 Died)
Pietro Cancellieri (Cavalieri) (3 October 1571 – 1580)
Paolo Bellardito (17 October 1580 – 1585 Resigned)
Martín Acuña, O. Carm. (11 December 1585 – 1593 Died)
Juan Pedro González de Mendoza, O.S.A. (7 June 1593 – 1599)
Alfonso Vidal, O.F.M. (23 November 1599– 17 September 1618)
Alberto Caccano, O.P. (1618–1627 Died)
Giuseppe Candido (1627–1644 Died)
Agostino Candido (1645–1650 Died)
Benedetto Geraci (1650–1660 Died)
Adamo Gentile (1660–1662 Died)
Francesco Arata (1663–1690 Died)
Gaetano de Castillo, C.R. (1691–1694 Died)
Gerolamo Ventimiglia, C.R. (1694–1709 Died)
Nicola Maria Tedeschi, O.S.B. (1710–1722 Resigned)
Pietro Vincenzo Platamone, O.P. (1722–1733 Died)
Bernardo Maria Beamonte, O.C.D. (11 May 1733 – 24 July 1742)
Francesco Maria Miceli (1743–1753 Died)
Vincenzo Maria de Francisco e Galletti, O.P. (1753–1769 Died)
Bonaventura Prestandrea, O.F.M. Conv. (1769–1777 Died)
Giuseppe Coppula  (1778–1789 Died)
Sede Vacante (1789–1802)

since 1800

Domenico Spoto (1802–1804 Confirmed, Bishop of Cefalù)
Antonino Reggio (1804–1806 Died)
Silvestro Todaro, O.F.M. Conv. (1807–1816 Confirmed, Bishop of Patti)
Carlo Maria Lenzi, Sch. P. (1818–1825 Died)
Pietro Tasca (1826–1827 Confirmed, Bishop of Cefalù)
Giovanni Portelli (1831–1838 Died)
Giovanni Maria Visconte Proto, O.S.B. (1839–1844)
Bonaventura Attanasio, C.SS.R. (1844–1857 Resigned)
Ludovico Ideo, O.P. (1858–1880 Died)
Mariano Palermo (1881–1887)
Giovanni Pietro Natoli (1890–1898 Died)
Nicola Maria Audino (1898–1903 Appointed, Bishop of Mazara del Vallo)
Francesco Maria Raiti, O. Carm. (1903–1906 Appointed, Bishop of Trapani)
Angelo Paino (1909–1921 Appointed, Coadjutor Archbishop of Messina)
Bernardino Salvatore Re, O.F.M. Cap. (1928–1963 Died)
Salvatore Nicolosi (1963–1970 Appointed, Bishop of Noto)
Ignazio Cannavò (1977–1986 Appointed, Archbishop of Messina-Lipari-Santa Lucia del Mela)

See also
Catholic Church in Italy

References

Sources

Reference Works
 (in Latin)
 (in Latin)

 pp. 946–947. (Use with caution; obsolete)
 (in Latin)
 (in Latin)
 (in Latin)

Studies

Kamp, Norbert (1975). Kirche und Monarchie im staufischen Königreich Sizilien: I. Prosopographische Grundlegung, Bistumer und Bischofe des Konigreichs 1194–1266: 3. Sizilien München: Wilhelm Fink 1975, pp. 1078–1108.

Rodriquez, Carlo "Breve cenno storico sulla Chiesa Liparese," 

Roman Catholic dioceses in Sicily
Dioceses established in the 5th century
Former Roman Catholic dioceses in Italy